Bar Europa is the sixth local season of the reality The Bar in Poland.

Synopsis
Start Date: 24 September 2005.
End Date: 10 December 2005.
Duration: 78 days.
Contestants:
The Finalists: Thomas (The Winner), Alex (Runner-up), Tomasz (3rd) & Anna Tro (4th).
Evicted Contestants: Agnieszka, Anna Try, Artur, Dariusz, Dorota, Farida, Grzegorz, Jurate, Katarzyna, Luca, Ludmiła, Marcin, Marco, Patrycja, Robert, Sebastian, Serguei & Vadim.
Voluntary Exits: Jurate & Serguei.

Contestants

Nominations

References

2005 Polish television seasons